Jacob Hayes House is a historic home located in Newlin Township, Chester County, Pennsylvania near the West Branch of Brandywine Creek. The house was built in 1841, and is a two-story, stuccoed stone dwelling in a Federal / Greek Revival style.  It features a full width front porch with ornate iron supports and scrollwork.

The great-uncle of Jacob Hayes first moved to Newlin Township in 1771, and his grandfather, Mordecai Hayes arrived in 1774.

The house is next door to the Hayes Homestead, built by his great-uncle.  Nearby is the Hayes Mill House, which both Mordecai and Jacob used to mill whetstones. 
The Jacob Hayes House was added to the National Register of Historic Places in 1985. Both the homestead and the mill house are also listed on the National Register.

References

Houses on the National Register of Historic Places in Pennsylvania
Federal architecture in Pennsylvania
Greek Revival houses in Pennsylvania
Houses completed in 1841
Houses in Chester County, Pennsylvania
National Register of Historic Places in Chester County, Pennsylvania